Joshua Swann was a member of the North Carolina General Assembly of 1779 from Tyrrell County. There have been several spelling of Joshua's last name, including "Swain".

References

Members of the North Carolina General Assembly